Esau Adenji (born 11 January 1944) is a Cameroonian long-distance runner. He competed in the 5000 metres at the 1968 Summer Olympics and the 1972 Summer Olympics.

References

External links

1944 births
Living people
Athletes (track and field) at the 1968 Summer Olympics
Athletes (track and field) at the 1972 Summer Olympics
Cameroonian male long-distance runners
Cameroonian male steeplechase runners
Olympic athletes of Cameroon